The vice-chancellor is the executive head of the University of Allahabad.

Vice-chancellors of University of Allahabad
The vice-chancellors of the University of Allahabad are as follows.
 Sir John Edge (1887–94)
 T. Conlan, Esq. (1894–98)
 Mt. Justice R.S. Aikman (1898-1900)
 Justice Sir George Knox (1900–06)
 Sir Sunder Lal (1906–08)
 Sir Robert Aikman (1908–09)
 Sir Henry George Richards (1909–12)
 Sir Sunder Lal (1912–17)
 Sir Pramada Charan Banerji (1917–19)
 Sir Theodore Caro Piggott (1919–20)
 Mr. Justice Gokul Prasad (1920–22)
 Sir Claude de la Fosse (1922–23)
 Mahamahopadhyaya Pt. Ganganatha Jha (1923–32)
 Pandit Iqbal Narain Gurtu (1932–38)
 Dr. Amarnatha Jha (1938–47)
 Dr. Tara Chand (1947–49)
 Dr. Dakshina Ranjan Bhattacharaya (1949–52)
 Professor Amulya Chandra Banerjee (1952–55)
 Shri B. N. Jha (1955–57)
 Dr. Shri Ranjan (1957–61)
 Justice P. K. Kaul (1961)
 Dr. Balbhadra Prasad (1961-1965)
 Mr. Ratan Kumar Nehru (1965–68)
 Prof A. B. Lal (1968–71)
 Dr. C.M. Bhatia (1971–72)
 Prof. Babu Ram Saxena (1972–73)
 Mr. Ram Sahai (1973–76)
 Dr. P. D. Hajela (1976–79)
 Prof. Adya Prasad (1979–80)
 Prof. U.N. Singh (1980–83)
 Prof. Gobind Chandra Pande (1983–84)
 Dr. R. P. Mishra (1984–87)
 Prof. W.U. Malik (1987–90)
 Prof. T. Pati (1990–91)
 Prof. Ram Charan Mehrotra (1991–93)
 Prof. U.N. Gupta (1993–94)
 Prof. S.C. Srivastava (1994–97)
 Prof. Chunni Lal Khetrapal (1998-2001)
 Prof. G.K. Mehta (2001-2004)
 Prof. Janak Pandey (2004, acting)
 Prof. H. R. Singh (2005, acting)
 Prof Rajan Harshe (2005 - 2010)
 Prof. K.G. Srivastava (2010, acting)
 Prof. N.R. Farooqi (2010 acting)
 Prof. A. K. Singh (2011 - 2014)
 Prof. N.R. Farooqi (2014 - 2015)
 Prof. A. Satyanarayana (2015 acting)
 Prof. R. L. Hangloo (2015 - 2020)
 Prof. K. S. Mishra (2020, acting)
 Prof. P. K. Sahoo (2020, acting)
 Prof. R. R. Tewari (January 2020, acting)
 Prof. Sangita Srivastava (November 2020 - till)

See also
University of Allahabad

References

Vice-Chancellors by university in India
University of Allahabad